The transforming growth factor beta (TGFβ) receptors are a family of serine/threonine kinase receptors involved in TGF beta signaling pathway. These receptors bind growth factor and cytokine signaling proteins in the TGF-beta family such as TGFβs (TGFβ1, TGFβ2, TGFβ3), bone morphogenetic proteins (BMPs), growth differentiation factors (GDFs), activin and inhibin, myostatin, anti-Müllerian hormone (AMH), and NODAL.

TGFβ family receptors
TGFβ family receptors are grouped into three types, type I, type II, and type III. There are seven type I receptors, termed the activin-like receptors (ALK1–7), five type II receptors, and one type III receptor, for a total of 13 TGFβ superfamily receptors. In the transduction pathway, ligand-bound type II receptors activate type I receptors by phosphorylation, which then autophosphorylate and bind SMAD. The Type I receptors have a glycine-serine (GS, or TTSGSGSG) repeat motif of around 30 AA, a target of type II activity.  At least three, and perhaps four to five of the serines and threonines in the GS domain, must be phosphorylated to fully activate TbetaR-1.

Type I

 ALK1 (ACVRL1)
 ALK2 (ACVR1A)
 ALK3 (BMPR1A)
 ALK4 (ACVR1B)
 ALK5 (TGFβR1)
 ALK6 (BMPR1B)
 ALK7 (ACVR1C)

Type II
 TGFβR2
 BMPR2
 ACVR2A
 ACVR2B
 AMHR2 (AMHR)

Type III
Unlike the Type I and II receptors which are kinases, TGFBR3 has a Zona pellucida-like domain. Its core domain binds TGF-beta family ligands and its heparan sulfate chains bind bFGF. It acts as a reservoir of ligand for TGF-beta receptors.

 TGFβR3 (β-glycan)

References

TGF beta receptors
Transmembrane receptors
Protein families